Cohen Live is a live album by Leonard Cohen released in 1994.

The songs were recorded live in 1988 on the I'm Your Man Tour and in 1993 on The Future World Tour. Several of the songs have altered lyrics, which are printed in the liner notes as sung.  This was Cohen's first live release since Live Songs in 1973.  Reviews were mixed, with Time writing, "This glum, melancholy collection should be dispensed only with large doses of Prozac."

Track listing
All songs written by Leonard Cohen, except where noted.
"Dance Me to the End of Love" (Toronto, June 17, 1993)
"Bird on the Wire" (Toronto, June 17, 1993)
"Everybody Knows" (Vancouver, June 29, 1993)  (Cohen, Sharon Robinson)
"Joan of Arc" (Toronto, June 17, 1993)
"There Is a War" (Toronto, June 17, 1993)
"Sisters of Mercy" (Toronto, June 18, 1993)
"Hallelujah" (Austin, October 31, 1988)
"I'm Your Man" (Toronto, June 17, 1993)
"Who by Fire?" (Austin, October 31, 1988)
"One of Us Cannot Be Wrong" (San Sebastian, May 20, 1988)
"If It Be Your Will" (Austin, October 31, 1988)
"Heart with No Companion" (Amsterdam, April 19, 1988)
"Suzanne" (Vancouver, June 29, 1993)

Personnel
Leonard Cohen – guitar, keyboard, vocals
Perla Batalla – vocals
Julie Christensen – vocals
Bob Furgo – keyboards, violin
Bob Metzger – guitars, pedal steel
Steve Meador – drums

Musicians 1988 
John Bilezikjian – oud, mandolin
Tom McMorran – keyboards
Stephen Zirkel – bass, trumpet, keyboards
Roscoe Beck – musical director

Musicians 1993 
Jorge Calderón – bass, vocals
Bill Ginn – keyboards
Paul Ostermayer – saxes, keyboards

External links
Leonard Cohen Files entry (includes lyrics)

References

Leonard Cohen live albums
1994 live albums
Sony Music live albums